Mohammed Chaara (born 16 August 1980 in Amsterdam, The Netherlands) is a Moroccan-Dutch television and film actor. Chaara started his career in soap opera Goudkust as "Samir" and is best known for his appearances in films Hush Hush Baby and Schnitzel Paradise. Chaara is a Muslim.

Films
1999 De straat is van ons (The street is ours)
2002 Oysters at Nam Kee's
2004 Shouf Shouf Habibi! (Hush Hush Baby)
2005 Zwarte Zwanen (Black Swans)
2005 Het schnitzelparadijs (Schnitzel Paradise)
2006 Nachtrit (Night Ride)
2007 Kicks
2011  - Mimo

Television
2000-2001 Goudkust (Goldcoast)2001 Spangen2002 2002 Hartslag I (Heartbeat I)2003 Hartslag II (Heartbeat II)2004 Missie Warmoesstraat (Mission Warmoesstraat)2005 Baantjer2005 Alex FM2006-2007 Shouf Shouf! de serie deel I (Hush Hush the series part I)2007 Shouf Shouf! de serie deel II (Hush Hush the series part II)2009 Shouf Shouf! de serie deel III (Hush Hush the series part III)2011  - candidate
2014 2015 Voetbalmeisjes - Choukri

 Presentations 
 2007: Planet Europe (NPS) - central presentation
 2008: In de buurt (AT5) - presentator

 Theater 
 2012: Ik Driss - Mustapha (Moes) 2014: Kapsalon de comedie - Abdeltief (Ab) 2015 Kapsalon de comedie reprise

 Regie 
 2008: Is Normaal toch - Amersfoort 2010: Samira The Movie - Amsterdam Transvaal 2011: Ede the Movie - Ede- Veldhuizen''

References

External links

1980 births
Living people
20th-century Dutch male actors
Dutch people of Moroccan descent
Male actors from Amsterdam
21st-century Dutch male actors
Dutch male film actors
Dutch male soap opera actors
Dutch male television actors